The name Susan has been used for twelve tropical cyclones worldwide, one in the Central Pacific Ocean, one in the South Pacific Ocean, and twelve in the Western Pacific Ocean. Additionally, the name Sue has been used once Australian region of the Indian Ocean.

In the Central Pacific:
 Hurricane Susan (1978) – Category 4 hurricane, initially tracked toward Hawaii before sharply veering away

In the South Pacific:
 Cyclone Susan (1997–98) – Category 5 tropical cyclone, one of the most intense tropical cyclones on record in the South Pacific basin; affected Vanuatu, Fiji, and New Zealand

In the Western Pacific:
 Typhoon Susan (1945)
 Typhoon Susan (1953) – Category 3 typhoon, struck Taiwan
 Typhoon Susan (1958) – Category 3 typhoon, remained over the open ocean
 Tropical Storm Susan (1961)
 Typhoon Susan (1963) – Category 4-equivalent typhoon
 Typhoon Susan (1966) (Oyang)
 Typhoon Susan (1969) (T6903, 03W, Atring) – struck the Central Philippines
 Typhoon Susan (1972) (Edeng)
 Tropical Storm Susan (1975)
 Tropical Storm Susan (1981)
 Tropical Storm Susan (1984) – struck South Central Vietnam
 Typhoon Susan (1988) (Biring)

In the Australian region:
 Cyclone Sue (1975) – far offshore from Indonesia

Pacific hurricane set index articles
Pacific typhoon set index articles
South Pacific cyclone set index articles